Sancha of Aragon (1186–1241) was the daughter of King Alfonso II of Aragon and his wife, Sancha of Castile. Through her marriage to Raymond VII, Count of Toulouse in 1211, she acquired the titles Countess of Toulouse and Marquise of Provence from then until their divorce in 1241.

Sancha's paternal grandparents were Ramon Berenguer IV, Count of Barcelona and Petronilla of Aragon; her maternal grandparents were Alfonso VII of León and Castile and Richeza of Poland, Queen of Castile. She was the sister of Peter II of Aragon and Alfonso II, Count of Provence. She had one child, Joan, Countess of Toulouse, who held the same titles as her mother from 1249 to 1271.

References

1186 births
1241 deaths
13th-century Spanish women
House of Barcelona
13th-century French women
Daughters of kings